Birmingham City Football Club is an English professional football club based in Birmingham. The club's involvement in European competition dates back to the 1950s.

Invitations to enter the Inter-Cities Fairs Cup, a football tournament set up to promote industrial trade fairs, were extended to the city hosting the trade fair rather than to clubs. Some cities entered a select team including players from more than one club, but Aston Villa, the other major club based in the city of Birmingham, rejected the opportunity to field a combined team. Thus Birmingham City became the first English club side to play in European competition when they played their first match in the 1955–58 Inter-Cities Fairs Cup on 15 May 1956. They were also the first English club side to reach a European final, the 1960 Fairs Cup final, in which they met Barcelona. The home leg, a goalless draw, was played on 29 March 1960 and the away leg, which Barcelona won 4–1, some six weeks later. In the semifinal of the 1961 Fairs Cup Birmingham beat Internazionale home and away; no other English club beat them in a competitive match in the San Siro until Arsenal did so in the Champions League more than 40 years later.

Victory in the 2011 Football League Cup Final earned Birmingham qualification for the 2011–12 UEFA Europa League, which they entered at the play-off round. A 3–0 aggregate victory over C.D. Nacional of Portugal qualified Birmingham for the group stage, in which they were drawn alongside last season's finalists, S.C. Braga of Portugal, Slovenian champions NK Maribor, and fourth-placed Belgian team Club Brugge. They finished third in group H, one point behind Club Brugge and Braga, so failed to qualify for the knockout rounds.

Record by season

Birmingham City's scores are given first in all scorelines.

Key
 PO = play-off round
 GS = group stage
 1R = first round
 2R = second round
 SF = semifinal
 F = final

European attendance records 

 Highest home attendance: 40,524, against Barcelona, 1960 Fairs Cup final first leg, 29 March 1960.
 Lowest home attendance: 14,152, against R. Union Saint-Gilloise, 1958–60 Fairs Cup semifinal second leg, 11 November 1959.
 Highest away attendance: 75,000, against Barcelona, 1958–60 Fairs Cup final second leg, 4 May 1960.
 Lowest away attendance: 2,500, against KB, 1960–61 Fairs Cup second round first leg, 23 November 1960.

Notes

References
General

Specific

External links
Birmingham City F.C. official site

Europe
English football clubs in international competitions